"Statement" is a single by Japanese experimental band Boris. The A-side "Statement" was a preview of things to come on their full-length album Smile, which was released on Diwphalanx Records and Southern Lord Records in 2008. The B-side "Floor Shaker" is an unreleased song from the Smile sessions exclusive to this single and its own single available free with purchase from the Inoxia Records store; this single version fades out early.

The logo on the cover is a tribute to the American black metal band Von, who use the same font and insert the same pentagram into the O.

"Statement" reached number 23 on Billboard'''s Hot Singles Sales for the week of March 29, 2008.[]

Both songs appear on the compilation album Boris / Variations + Live in Japan''.

Track listing

Pressing History

References

2008 singles
Boris (band) songs
2008 songs
Song articles with missing songwriters